Play is an album by Bobby McFerrin and Chick Corea.

Track listing 
 "Spain" (Chick Corea, Joaquín Rodrigo) – 10:12 
 "Even From Me" (Bobby McFerrin, Chick Corea) – 6:34 
 "Autumn Leaves" (Jacques Prévert, Johnny Mercer, Joseph Kosma) – 11:41 
 "Blues Connotation" (Ornette Coleman) – 7:13 
 "'Round Midnight" (Bernie Hanighen, Cootie Williams, Thelonious Monk) – 7:59 
 "Blue Bossa" (Kenny Dorham) – 6:14

Personnel 
Musicians
 Bobby McFerrin – vocals
 Chick Corea – piano

Production
 Linda Goldstein  – producer
 Adam Pinch  – engineer
 Chris Tergesen  – engineer (mixing)
 John Harris  – engineer
 Bernie Kirsh  – engineer
 Greg Calbi  – engineer (mastering)
 Cynthia Cochrane  – art Direction
 Patrick Roques  – design

References 

 

Bobby McFerrin albums
Chick Corea live albums
Vocal–instrumental duet albums
1992 live albums
Blue Note Records live albums
albums recorded at Carnegie Hall